"On the Radio" is a song by American singer-songwriter Donna Summer, produced by Italian musician Giorgio Moroder, and released in late 1979 on the Casablanca record label. It was written for the soundtrack to the film Foxes and included on Summer's first international compilation album On the Radio: Greatest Hits Volumes I & II.

History
The song was released in three formats: the radio 45rpm single; the 5+ minute version included on Summer's Greatest Hits double album package, and a DJ Promo 7+ minute version released on 12" single (and included on the Foxes film soundtrack album). This last version was later released on the Bad Girls CD digipack double CD release. The Foxes soundtrack also includes an instrumental version of the song in a ballad tempo and crediting Moroder as a solo artist. In the film, the ballad tempo and the disco version are both heard with Donna Summer's vocals. Donna Summer performed "On the Radio" on many television shows such as American Bandstand.

The instrumental parts of this song were occasionally heard on the US version of The Price Is Right in the early 1980s when they displayed jukeboxes and stereos as prizes. While the first two versions included all written lyrics, the DJ Promo omitted the final verse, opting instead to repeat the third. Only the first "short" version ended with the famous "on the radio – adio – adio" echo vocal effect. For the second consecutive year, Summer placed at least three singles in the Billboard Year-End charts in 1980.

Commercial performance
"On the Radio" was released as a single and became, in February 1980, her tenth top-ten hit in the U.S. as well as her eighth and final consecutive top-five single. "On the Radio" peaked at number five on the Billboard Hot 100 and number nine on the soul chart. The song was also Summer's 14th entry on the Billboard Disco chart, where it peaked at number eight. In Canada, it peaked at number two.

Official versions
"On the Radio" (single version) – 4:00
"On the Radio" (On the Radio: Greatest Hits Vol. 1 & 2: long version) – 5:50
"On the Radio" (Foxes soundtrack and 12" single version) – 7:34
"On the Radio" (piano instrumental version from Foxes soundtrack) – 4:27

Personnel
All vocals and lyrics by Donna Summer
Music written by Giorgio Moroder and Donna Summer
Produced by Giorgio Moroder

Charts

Weekly charts

Year-end charts

Certifications and sales

Martine McCutcheon version

English singer and actress Martine McCutcheon covered "On the Radio" and released it as the second single from her second album, Wishing, on January 22, 2001. Her version was produced by John Poppo. Although it became McCutcheon's fifth consecutive top-ten hit on the UK Singles Chart, peaking at number seven, it is to date her last single to appear within the top 100 on the UK chart, and it would be her last single until 2017's "Say I'm Not Alone". In Ireland, "On the Radio" reached number 18, matching the peak of the original.

Track listings
UK CD1
 "On the Radio" (radio mix) – 3:49
 "It's All Over Again" – 4:42
 "On the Radio" (Pants & Corset radio edit) – 3:33
 "On the Radio" (video) – 3:45

UK CD2
 "On the Radio" (radio mix) – 3:49
 "On the Radio" (Pants & Corset club mix) – 7:33
 "On the Radio" (Robbie Rivera's vocal mix) – 7:35

UK cassette single
A1. "On the Radio" (radio mix) – 3:49
A2. "On the Radio" (Almighty radio edit) – 4:14
B1. "On the Radio" (Pants & Corset radio edit) – 3:33

Charts

Weekly charts

Year-end charts

References

External links
 

1979 singles
1979 songs
2001 singles
Casablanca Records singles
Donna Summer songs
Innocent Records singles
Martine McCutcheon songs
Rockell songs
Song recordings produced by Giorgio Moroder
Songs about radio
Songs written by Donna Summer
Songs written by Giorgio Moroder
Virgin Records singles